Petrophile serruriae is a species of flowering plant in the family Proteaceae and is endemic to southwestern Western Australia. It is a shrub with crowded, pinnate, needle-shaped, sharply-pointed leaves, and oval heads of silky-hairy yellow, greyish mauve to pink flowers.

Description
It has silky-hairy branchlets and leaves but does not form a lignotuber. Flowering mainly occurs from July to December and the fruit is a nut, fused with others in a oval to spherical head  in diameter.

Taxonomy
Petrophile serruriae was first formally described in 1830 by Robert Brown in the Supplementum to his Prodromus Florae Novae Hollandiae et Insulae Van Diemen from material collected by William Baxter near King George Sound in 1823. The specific epithet (serruriae) means "like a plant in the genus Serruria".

Distribution and habitat
Petrophile serruriae is common in coastal limestone and is widespread from near Geraldton to near Albany in the south-west of Western Australia.

Conservation status
This petrophile is classified as "not threatened" by the Western Australian Government Department of Parks and Wildlife.

References

serruriae
Eudicots of Western Australia
Endemic flora of Western Australia
Plants described in 1830
Taxa named by Robert Brown (botanist, born 1773)